Julie Kagawa (born October 12, 1982) is an American author, best known for publishing and writing The Iron Fey Series consisting of 15 books including: The Iron King, The Iron Daughter, The Iron Queen, and The Iron Knight.

Biography
She was born in Sacramento, California, but moved to Hawaii with her family at the age of nine. Kagawa is of Japanese descent. She currently lives in Louisville, Kentucky. Kagawa has written novellas, along with novels. Three novellas were written in the Iron Fey series: Winter's Passage, Summer's Crossing, and Iron's Prophecy. In August all three were published together as The Iron Legends. A short novella of the lovers of the Iron Fey series during Valentine's Day was published on Kagawa's website. She has written a spin-off series of the Iron Fey called Call of the Forgotten. The first book, The Lost Prince, was published in October 2012. The second book, The Iron Traitor, was published on 29 October 2013.

Kagawa's vampire series is called Blood of Eden. The first book of this series is called The Immortal Rules and was published April 24, 2012. The second book is titled The Eternity Cure and was published May 1, 2013. The series has been optioned to become a movie by Joni Sighvatsson of Palomar Pictures. Kagawa has also opened her own Etsy shop where she sells her miniature clay figurines. She also draws illustrations that match her books.

Bibliography

The Iron Fey Series
 The Iron King (2010)
 First Kiss (2013) short scene from Ash's point of view. Available online.
 Winter's Passage (2010) short fiction published in the anthology The Iron Legends
 The Iron Daughter (2010)
 The Iron Queen (2011)
 Summer's Crossing (2011) short fiction published in the anthology The Iron Legends
 The Iron Knight (2011)
 Iron's Prophecy (released September 1, 2012) short fiction published in the anthology The Iron Legends
 The Iron Legends (released August 28, 2012) omnibus edition
 The Iron Raven

The Iron Fey: Call of the Forgotten Trilogy
 The Lost Prince (released October 23, 2012)
 The Iron Traitor (released October 29, 2013)
The Iron Warrior (released October 27, 2015)

Blood of Eden
 Dawn of Eden (released January 29, 2013), short story published in 'Til The World Ends 
 The Immortal Rules (released April 24, 2012)
 The Eternity Cure (released April 30, 2013)
 The Forever Song (released April 15, 2014)

Talon series
 Talon (released October 28, 2014)
 Rogue (released May 1, 2015)
 Soldier (released April 26, 2016)
 Legion (released May 4, 2017)
 Inferno (release April 24, 2018)

Shadow of the Fox series
 Shadow of the Fox (released October 2, 2018) 
 Soul of the Sword (released June, 2019) 
 Night of the Dragon (released April, 2020)

Other
 "Eyes like Candlelight" in A Thousand Beginnings and Endings, edited by Ellen Oh and Elsie Chapman (June 26, 2018)
 Shinji Takahashi and the Mark of the Coatl (released April 26, 2022)

References

External links
Official website www.juliekagawa.com

Living people
21st-century American novelists
American fantasy writers
American women novelists
American writers of Japanese descent
American novelists of Asian descent
American women writers of Asian descent
1982 births
Women science fiction and fantasy writers
Writers from Louisville, Kentucky
21st-century American women writers
RITA Award winners
Women romantic fiction writers
Novelists from Kentucky
Kentucky women writers